The Namibia cricket team toured Zimbabwe in May 2022 to play five Twenty20 International (T20I) matches. The matches were played at the Queens Sports Club in Bulawayo, and it was the first men's T20I series between Zimbabwe and Namibia.

Zimbabwe won the opening match of the series by seven runs, with captain Craig Ervine scoring an unbeaten 55 runs. Namibia then won the second match by eight wickets to level the series, and recorded their first win against Zimbabwe in international cricket. Zimbabwe then won the third T20I by eight wickets, with Wesley Madhevere finishing 73 not out. Namibia went on to win the fourth match, with captain Gerhard Erasmus scoring 59 not out. Zane Green hit the winning runs from the last ball of the game, to level the series at 2–2, with one match to play. In the fifth and final match, Namibia won by 32 runs, to win the series 3–2. It was the first time that Namibia had won a bilateral series against a Full Member side.

Squads

T20I series

1st T20I

2nd T20I

3rd T20I

4th T20I

5th T20I

Notes

References

External links
 Series home at ESPN Cricinfo

2022 in Namibian cricket
2022 in Zimbabwean cricket
International cricket competitions in 2022
International cricket tours of Zimbabwe